Harzand-e Jadid (also Romanized as Harzand-e Jadīd; also known as Chairazan, Chāy-e Harzand, and Chāy Razān) is a village in Harzandat-e Sharqi Rural District of the Central District of Marand County, East Azerbaijan province, Iran. At the 2006 National Census, its population was 1,051 in 337 households. The following census in 2011 counted 966 people in 344 households. The latest census in 2016 showed a population of 841 people in 313 households; it was the largest village in its rural district.

References 

Marand County

Populated places in East Azerbaijan Province

Populated places in Marand County